Luke A. Biasi (born July 15, 1999) is an American soccer player who currently plays as a defender for the Pittsburgh Riverhounds in the USL Championship.

Career

Youth
Biasi played high school soccer at Flowery Branch High School, as well as playing club soccer for a year with Georgia United, six years with Atlanta Fire United and a single year at the United Futbol Academy.

College & Amateur
In 2017, Biasi attended the University of Memphis to play college soccer. Over four seasons with the Tigers, included a truncated 2020 season due to the COVID-19 pandemic, Biasi made 49 appearances, scoring one goal and tallying two assists. He was named AAC All-Academic Team in both 2017 and 2018. In 2021, Biasi transferred to Syracuse University for his full senior season, making 18 appearances and finishing with one assist to his name.

While at college, Biasi spent time in the USL PDL, now named the USL League Two, with Peachtree City MOBA in 2018, and Southern Soccer Academy Kings in 2021.

Professional
On February 24, 2022, Biasi signed his first professional contract, joining USL Championship club Pittsburgh Riverhounds prior to their 2022 season. He made his professional debut on April 2, 2022, starting in a 2–0 win over Loudoun United.

References

External links
Luke Biasi Pittsburgh Riverhounds Profile

1999 births
Living people
American soccer players
Association football defenders
Memphis Tigers men's soccer players
Peachtree City MOBA players
People from Buford, Georgia
Pittsburgh Riverhounds SC players
Soccer players from Georgia (U.S. state)
Syracuse Orange men's soccer players
USL Championship players
USL League Two players